The Global 10s is a rugby tens tournament held during February each year in Brisbane at Suncorp Stadium. It is hosted by Duco Events and the Queensland Rugby Union. The inaugural tournament was held in 2017.

The Super Rugby teams from Australia and New Zealand take part in the tournament each year with other teams from around the world also invited. For the 2017 tournament, RC Toulonnais, Blue Bulls, Manu Samoa, and the Panasonic Wild Knights were invited.

The teams compete for a grand prize of $250,000 AUD over two days, first playing in group stages before entering finals. Between 300 and 400 players attend each event. A 'legend wildcard', is allocated to each team allowing a former star player to join their match day squads.

The tournament provides a small economic boost to Queensland through tourism and consumer spending.

Overview 

A Tens game lasts 20 minutes with 10 minutes for each half, except for the final, which lasts 30 minutes with 15 minutes for each half. After a try is scored, 40 seconds is then allocated for a drop goal.

Venue 
For the first four years of the tournament, Suncorp Stadium will be used to host the event. Suncorp Stadium has a capacity of 52,500.

Winners

Men

Women
First contested in 2018.

References

External links
 

Rugby union competitions in Queensland
Sport in Brisbane
Rugby tens
2017 in Australian rugby union
Recurring sporting events established in 2017
2017 establishments in Australia